Mount Carmel is a hamlet in Humboldt Rural Municipality No. 370, Saskatchewan, Canada. The hamlet is located 5 km south of Highway 5, and about 11 km southwest of the City of Humboldt.

See also
 List of communities in Saskatchewan
 Hamlets of Saskatchewan

References

External links

Unincorporated communities in Saskatchewan
Ghost towns in Saskatchewan
Humboldt No. 370, Saskatchewan
Division No. 15, Saskatchewan